The 2015 Handball Super Cup was the 19th edition of the Handball Super Cup, a prestigious friendly men's handball tournament organised every two years by the German Handball Association, it was held between 06–8 November at the cities of Flensburg, Hamburg, and Kiel.

Results

Round robin

Final standing

External links
German Handball Association Official Website

References

2015 in handball